Ahituv is a moshav in central Israel. Located near Hadera, it falls under the jurisdiction of Hefer Valley Regional Council.

History
The moshav was founded in 1951 by immigrants from Iran and Iraq. Its name was taken from Ahituv ben Pinchas, son of Eli mentioned in 1 Samuel 14:3;
as well as Ahitub the father of Zadok who anointed Solomon as king.
mentioned in 2 Samuel 8:17; and in 1 Kings 1:39;

References

Iranian-Jewish culture in Israel
Iraqi-Jewish culture in Israel
Moshavim
Populated places established in 1951
Populated places in Central District (Israel)
1951 establishments in Israel